Baleshwar Yadav may refer to:
 Baleshwar Yadav (politician)
 Baleshwar Yadav (singer)